Kate Bush is an English singer, songwriter, record producer and dancer.

The name may also refer to two records by Kate Bush:
 Kate Bush (album), a 1984 compilation album, released only in East Germany
 Kate Bush (EP), an 1983 five-song 12" EP, released in the USA